Peachtree, peach tree or variations may refer to:

 Peach, the fruit-bearing tree, Prunus persica

Places
 Peachtree, West Virginia
 Peachtree City, Georgia, a southern suburb of Atlanta
 Peachtree Corners, Georgia, a northern suburb of Atlanta

Products and business
 Peachtree Accounting, business management software by now known as Sage 50 Accounting
 Peachtree Financial Solutions, a financial services company
 Peachtree liqueur, manufactured by De Kuyper Royal Distillers
 Peachtree TV, on-air branding of Atlanta station WPCH-TV

Other uses
 Peachtree Road Race, a 10 kilometer footrace in Atlanta
 Peachtree Street, the main street of Atlanta